Syed Faisal Ahmed  is British physician and academic who holds the Samson Gemmell Chair of Child Health at the University of Glasgow. Ahmed is an honorary consultant paediatric endocrinologist at the Royal Hospital for Children Glasgow and was appointed to this post in 2012, being the seventh clinical academic to hold this endowed professorship.

Research
Ahmed's research has received funding from several sources and has gained international attention in a wide range of research activities. His pioneering work in skeletal development has provided deep insight into the role of the GH/IGF-1 system as well as led to innovative methods of assessing bone quality. His research in sex development has had impact in several areas but, most importantly, he developed and continues to lead a highly successful international research consortium that started as the International DSD Registry (I-DSD). To improve the health of people in Scotland with DSD he founded the Scottish DSD Network in 2005, one of the first national clinical networks in Scotland; in the UK and internationally, he led the development of the UK DSD consensus guidelines and, was one of the members of the 2005 Chicago Consensus group.

In 2021, Ahmed was awarded the 2021 Research Award for his scientific contributions to the field of paediatric endocrinology.

References 

Academics of the University of Glasgow
British paediatric endocrinologists
Human sex difference researchers
Alumni of the University of Edinburgh Medical School
1964 births
Living people